The Quartz Valley Indian Community of the Quartz Valley Reservation of California is a federally recognized tribe of Klamath, Karuk, and Shasta Indians in Siskiyou County, California.

Reservation
The Quartz Valley Reservation was originally located near the current reservation but was terminated by the US government in the 1960s. The current reservation is  large, and the tribe is working to acquire additional lands.

Nearby communities are Greenview, Fort Jones, and Etna, California.

Education
For elementary education, part of the reservation is served by the Quartz Valley Elementary School District and the other portion by the Etna Union Elementary School District.  For secondary education, the entire reservation is served by the Etna Union High School District.

Notes

External links
 Quartz Valley Indian Community, official website
 Corporate Charter of the Quartz Valley Indian Community - Native American Constitution and Law Digitization Project
 Final Environmental Assessment, Quartz Valley Indian Reservation Wells Project - August 2010, with map showing the reservation's location

Federally recognized tribes in the United States
Karuk
Klamath
Geography of Siskiyou County, California
Native American tribes in California
American Indian reservations in California